William James Campbell (November 5, 1873 – October 6, 1957) was an American professional baseball player.  He was a left-handed pitcher over parts of four seasons (1905, 1907–09) with the St. Louis Cardinals and Cincinnati Reds.  For his career, he compiled a 23–25 record, with a 2.80 earned run average, and 116 strikeouts in 407⅔ innings pitched.

He was born in Pittsburgh, Pennsylvania and later died in Cincinnati, Ohio at the age of 83.

External links

1873 births
1957 deaths
St. Louis Cardinals players
Cincinnati Reds players
Major League Baseball pitchers
Baseball players from Pennsylvania
Wheeling Nailers (baseball) players
Grand Rapids Cabinet Makers players
Grand Rapids Furniture Makers players
Springfield Wanderers players
Columbus Senators players
Birmingham Barons players
Louisville Colonels (minor league) players
Harrisburg Senators players
Kansas City Blues (baseball) players
Mobile Sea Gulls players